Mingus at Monterey is a live album by the jazz bassist and composer Charles Mingus, recorded in 1964 at the Monterey Jazz Festival and originally released on Mingus's short-lived mail-order Jazz Workshop label but subsequently released on other labels.

Reception
The AllMusic review by Scott Yanow stated: "One of the highpoints of Charles Mingus's career was his appearance at the 1964 Monterey Jazz Festival... it showcases the bassist/composer/bandleader at the peak of his powers".

Track listing
All compositions by Charles Mingus except as indicated
 "Duke Ellington Medley: I've Got It Bad" (Duke Ellington) - 4:14 
 "Duke Ellington Medley: In a Sentimental Mood" (Ellington) - 1:46 
 "Duke Ellington Medley: All Too Soon" (Ellington) - 1:53 
 "Duke Ellington Medley: Mood Indigo" (Ellington) - 0:59 
 "Duke Ellington Medley: Sophisticated Lady" (Ellington) - 1:46 
 "Duke Ellington Medley: A Train" (Billy Strayhorn) - 13:54 
 "Orange Was the Color of Her Dress, Then Blue Silk" - 13:04 
 "Meditations on Integration" - 22:48
Recorded at the Monterey Jazz Festival in California on September 20, 1964

Personnel
Charles Mingus - bass, piano
Lonnie Hillyer - trumpet
Charles McPherson - alto saxophone
Jaki Byard - piano
Dannie Richmond - drums
Bobby Bryant, Melvin Moore - trumpet (track 8)
Lou Blackburn - trombone (track 8)
Red Callender - tuba (track 8)
Buddy Collette - flute, piccolo, alto saxophone (track 8)
Jack Nimitz - bass clarinet, baritone saxophone (track 8)  
John Handy - tenor saxophone (tracks 6 & 8)

References

Charles Mingus live albums
1964 live albums
Prestige Records live albums
Albums recorded at the Monterey Jazz Festival